Kim Young-jun (born 21 March 1948) is a South Korean former wrestler who competed in the 1972 Summer Olympics.

References

External links
 

1948 births
Living people
Olympic wrestlers of South Korea
Wrestlers at the 1972 Summer Olympics
South Korean male sport wrestlers
Asian Games medalists in wrestling
Wrestlers at the 1970 Asian Games
Wrestlers at the 1974 Asian Games
Asian Games bronze medalists for South Korea
Medalists at the 1970 Asian Games
20th-century South Korean people
21st-century South Korean people